"Crush" is the third single by British rapper Fugative, featuring Troy & Martika of the British group Ruff Diamondz. It was released as a Digital Download on 9 May 2010, with the CD single being released the following day. According to the Official Chart Update, it became Fugative's most successful single to date. On 16 May 2010 the single entered the UK Singles Chart at number 26, making it his first Top 40 hit.

Track listing
UK iTunes download
 "Crush" featuring Ruff Diamondz (radio edit) – 3:09
 "Crush" (Moto Blanco edit) – 3:21
 "Crush" (Moto Blanco club mix) – 7:12
 "Crush" (Scratcher and DVA remix) – 4:19
 "Crush" (Nadastorm remix) – 5:15

UK CD single
 "Crush" (radio edit)
 "Crush" (Moto Blanco edit)
 "Crush" (Moto Blanco remix)
 "Crush" (DVA remix)
 "Crush" (Nadatrom remix)
 "Crush" (Bass Slammers remix)

Chart performance
"Crush" debuted on the UK Singles Chart on 16 May 2010 at a current peak of #26. Crush spent two weeks inside the top 100 the 2nd week going down to 53. The single also managed to reach #5 on the UK Dance Chart as well as claiming the number-one spot on the UK Indie Chart.

Release history

References

2010 songs
2010 singles
Fugative songs
Song recordings produced by Naughty Boy